This is a summary of 1928 in music in the United Kingdom.

Events
January – Edward German is knighted for services to music.
April – While studying under Frank Bridge, 15-year-old Benjamin Britten composes his String Quartet in F.
June – Herbert Sumsion leaves the United States for the UK to take up the post of organist at Gloucester Cathedral.
9 August – Percy Grainger marries Swedish artist Ella Ström at the Hollywood Bowl.
September – Benjamin Britten goes as a boarder to Gresham's School, in Holt, Norfolk.
10 October – Eric Fenby arrives in Grez to begin work as amanuensis for Frederick Delius.
date unknown
Malcolm Sargent becomes conductor of the Royal Choral Society.
Arnold Bax begins taking an annual working holiday in Morar, in the west Scottish Highlands.

Popular music
Noël Coward – "World Weary"

Classical music: new works
Kenneth J. Alford – Dunedin (march)
Granville Bantock – Pagan Symphony
Arthur Bliss – Pastoral 'Lie strewn the white flocks'
Hamilton Harty – Suite for Cello and Piano
Gustav Holst – A Moorside Suite
John Ireland – Two Songs, 1928
Cyril Rootham – "On the Morning of Christ's Nativity"
Ralph Vaughan Williams – Te Deum in G major
William Walton – Sinfonia Concertante

Opera
Stanley Bate – The Forest Enchanted
William Henry Bell – The Mouse Trap; libretto after The Sire de Maletroit's Door by Robert Louis Stevenson

Musical theatre
The Good Old Days of England, music by Percy Fletcher, libretto by Oscar Asche

Births
17 January – Matt McGinn, folk singer (died 1977)
8 February – Osian Ellis, harpist
5 March – Diana Coupland, singer and actress (died 2006)
6 March – Ronald Stevenson, composer and pianist (died 2015)
13 March – Ronnie Hazlehurst, conductor and composer (died 2007)
2 April – April Cantelo, soprano
4 April 
Jimmy Logan, entertainer (died 2001)
Monty Norman, singer and composer of the James Bond signature tune
19 April – Alexis Korner, blues musician and historian (died 1984)
27 May – Thea Musgrave, composer
6 July – Peter Glossop, operatic baritone (died 2008)
16 July – Bryden Thomson, orchestral conductor (died 1991)
20 July – Peter Ind, jazz double-bassist and record producer
26 August – Andrew Porter, music critic (died 2015)
6 October – Flora MacNeil, singer in Scottish Gaelic (died 2015)
20 December – Donald Adams, operatic bass-baritone (died 1996)

Deaths
1 March – Sir Herbert Brewer, organist and composer (born 1865)
27 March – Leslie Stuart, musical theatre composer (born 1863)
13 May – David Thomas, composer (born 1881)
21 June – Marie Novello, pianist (born 1898)
12 September – Howard Talbot, conductor and composer (born 1865)
30 October – Percy Anderson, D'Oyly Carte stage designer (born 1851)
26 November – Herbert Sullivan, nephew and biographer of Sir Arthur Sullivan (born 1868)

See also
 1928 in British television
 1928 in the United Kingdom
 List of British films of 1928

References

British Music, 1928 in
Music
British music by year
1920s in British music